= List of banks in Christmas Island =

On the Christmas Island, Australia is a branch of Westpac.
